Division No. 3 is a census division located within the Pembina Valley Region in the south-central region of the province of Manitoba, Canada. Unlike in some other provinces, census divisions do not reflect the organization of local government in Manitoba. These areas exist solely for the purposes of statistical analysis and presentation; they have no government of their own. 

Its major service centre is the city of Winkler. Other important towns include Morden, Altona, and Carman. The major industry of the Pembina Valley is agriculture.

Demographics 

Cities

 Winkler
 Morden

Towns

 Altona
 Carman
 Morris

Rural municipalities

 Dufferin
 Emerson – Franklin (part in Division No. 2)
 Montcalm
 Morris
 Rhineland
 Roland
 Stanley
 Thompson

References

External links
Manitoba Regional Profiles: Pembina Valley Region
Pembina Valley Development Corporation
Pembina Valley Tourism 

03
Pembina Valley Region